Thisizima fasciaria is a moth of the family Tineidae. It is found in China (Fujian, Hong Kong).

The wingspan is 13−15 mm for males male and 17 mm for females. The forewing ground
color is bright white with a black triangular patch from the costal margin to the dorsum on the basal 1/6 and an oblique, black fascia from the basal 1/3 to just before the middle of the dorsum. There is also a rectangular black patch from the outer margin of the cell to the distal 1/6 of the forewing, confluent with two black subtriangular patches from the costa and termen before apex respectively, forming a broad Y-shaped pattern. Furthermore, there are two black costal spots between the oblique fascia and the Y-shaped pattern. The termen and dorsum are scattered with faint dark brown dots. The fringe is yellowish brown. The hindwings are light grayish brown with a gray fringe.

Etymology
The specific name is derived from Latin fasciarius (meaning fascia) and refers to the oblique, black fascia near the middle of the forewing.

References

Moths described in 2012
Tineidae